Haris Fakić (born 3 March 1982) is a Macedonian retired footballer.

Club career
Born in Skopje, he played from 2001 to 2002 Sloga Jugomagnat Skopje where he won the championship and the national cup. As early as next season's first transfer of the Serbian OFK Belgrade where he stayed only one season and won the award for the third best defender on the team OFK Belgrade. followed by the transfer of the team FC Cementarnica 55 where he won the national cup. where he won the national cup Beside various Macedonian clubs that he represented, he played in Serbia in OFK Beograd, and in Finland in Porin Palloilijat better known simply as FC PoPa.
in 2015, he became sporting director of FC Skenderbeu Korca.

International career
Despite having Bosnian roots, Haris was selected several times to represent the Macedonia national under-21 football team.

External sources
 Stats for 2004–2005 from Macedonian Football Federation
 Profile in FC PoPa official website

1982 births
Living people
Footballers from Skopje
Macedonian people of Bosnia and Herzegovina descent
Association football defenders
Macedonian footballers
North Macedonia under-21 international footballers
FK Sloga Jugomagnat players
OFK Beograd players
FK Cementarnica 55 players
FK Bregalnica Štip players
Porin Palloilijat players
FK Metalurg Skopje players
KF Shkëndija players
Macedonian First Football League players
First League of Serbia and Montenegro players
Kakkonen players
Macedonian expatriate footballers
Expatriate footballers in Serbia and Montenegro
Macedonian expatriate sportspeople in Serbia and Montenegro
Expatriate footballers in Finland
Macedonian expatriate sportspeople in Finland